4867 Polites  is a Jupiter trojan from the Trojan camp, approximately  in diameter. It was discovered on 27 September 1989, by American astronomer Carolyn Shoemaker at the Palomar Observatory in California. The dark Jovian asteroid belongs to the 80 largest Jupiter trojans and has a rotation period of 11.2 hours. It was named after the Trojan prince Polites from Greek mythology.

Orbit and classification 

Polites is a dark Jovian asteroid in a 1:1 orbital resonance with Jupiter. It is located in the trailering Trojan camp at the Gas Giant's  Lagrangian point, 60° behind its orbit . It is also a non-family asteroid of the Jovian background population.

It orbits the Sun at a distance of 5.1–5.3 AU once every 11 years and 9 months (4,285 days; semi-major axis of 5.16 AU). Its orbit has an eccentricity of 0.02 and an inclination of 27° with respect to the ecliptic.

Physical characteristics 

Polites is an assumed C-type asteroid. Its V–I color index of 1.01 is one of the highest among the larger Jupiter trojans (see table below).

Rotation period 

In August 2010, a rotational lightcurve of Polites was obtained from photometric observations over five nights by Linda French at the Cerro Tololo Inter-American Observatory in Chile. Lightcurve analysis gave a tentative rotation period of 9.21 hours with a low brightness variation of 0.09 magnitude.

Follow-up observations on a yearly basis by Robert D. Stephens and Daniel Coley at the Center for Solar System Studies gave several lightcurves during 2013–2018. The best-rated one from January 2016 gave a period of  hours and an amplitude of 0.15 magnitude.

Diameter and albedo 

According to the surveys carried out by the Japanese Akari satellite, the NEOWISE mission of NASA's Wide-field Infrared Survey Explorer, and the Infrared Astronomical Satellite IRAS, Polites measures between 57.25 and 65.16 kilometers in diameter and its surface has an albedo between 0.071 and 0.078. The Collaborative Asteroid Lightcurve Link assumes a standard albedo for a carbonaceous asteroid of 0.057 and calculates a diameter of 58.29 kilometers based on an absolute magnitude of 9.9.

Naming 

This minor planet was named by the discoverer from Greek mythology after the Trojan prince Polites, son of King Priam and Hecuba. He was killed with a spear handled by Achille's son Neoptolemus (Pyrrhus), who was the most ruthless of the Greeks. During the fall of Troy, he invaded Priam's great house and chased Polites until he cornered and slaughtered him in front of his parents.

The official naming citation was published by the Minor Planet Center on 4 June 1993.

Notes

References

External links 
 Asteroid Lightcurve Database (LCDB), query form (info )
 Dictionary of Minor Planet Names, Google books
 Discovery Circumstances: Numbered Minor Planets (1)-(5000) – Minor Planet Center
 Asteroid 4867 Polites at the Small Bodies Data Ferret
 
 

004867
Discoveries by Carolyn S. Shoemaker
Named minor planets
19890927